Niilo Mäenpää (born 14 January 1998) is a Finnish professional footballer who plays as a midfielder for Ekstraklasa side Warta Poznań and the Finland national team.

Career

Hämeenlinna
Mäenpää started his senior career with the club, making his first competitive appearance on 23 May 2014 in a 1-0 home victory in the league over Tampereen-Viipurin Ilves-Kissat. He was subbed on for Juho Saarinen in the 68th minute.

Haka
In January 2015, Mäenpää moved to Ykkönen club FC Haka. He made his league debut for the club on 2 May 2015, playing all ninety minutes in a 2-2 away draw with JJK. He scored his first competitive goal for the club on 2 August 2015 in a 4-3 away victory in the league over MP. His goal, scored in the 69th minute, made the score 4-1 to Haka.

Inter Turku
In November 2017, Mäenpää moved to Veikkausliiga club Inter Turku, arriving alongside Mikko Kuningas. He made his league debut for the club on 7 April 2018 in a 2-0 away defeat to VPS, playing 63 minutes before being subbed off, to be replaced by Arttu Hoskonen.

IFK Mariehamn
On 28 November 2019 it was confirmed, that Mäenpää would join IFK Mariehamn from the 2020 season, signing a deal until the end of 2021.

Warta Poznań
On 22 December 2021, Mäenpää penned a two-and-a-half-year deal with Polish Ekstraklasa club Warta Poznań, effective from 1 January 2022.

Personal life
Mäenpää's twin brother Aapo is also a professional footballer. The two played together in their early years at Hämeenlinna and Haka, before reuniting at Mariehamm beginning in 2020.

Career statistics

Club

Honours
Inter Turku
Finnish Cup: 2017–18

References

External links

1998 births
Living people
Finnish footballers
Finland youth international footballers
Finland international footballers
FC Haka players
FC Hämeenlinna players
FC Inter Turku players
IFK Mariehamn players
Warta Poznań players
Veikkausliiga players
Ekstraklasa players
Association football midfielders
Expatriate footballers in Poland
Finnish expatriate sportspeople in Poland
Finnish expatriate footballers
People from Hämeenlinna
Finland under-21 international footballers
Sportspeople from Kanta-Häme